, also known as Yuyu-uta, is a Japanese YouTuber, entertainer, and musician.

Biography 
Suzuki was born in Kawasaki, Kanagawa where he attended Toko Gakuen High School, then graduated from Tokyo Metropolitan University in 2010.

He began playing the piano at the age of 3 and originally started out on Niconico in 2007, though he didn't rise to fame until 2015 when he started to mess around with memetic songs that he later found himself in trouble for. Soon after, he made a YouTube account in May 2018, later choosing to retire his Niconico account in April 2020.

As for his content, his most famous songs are typically crude, but popular among young Japanese people. In addition, he challenges himself to play the piano for extensive periods of time and was able to play for over 24 hours on May 10, 2020.

Songs

References

External links 
 
 
 

Living people
1988 births
Japanese YouTubers
People from Kawasaki, Kanagawa